Beatriz Haddad Maia and Nadia Podoroska were the defending champions, but Haddad Maia could not participate this year due to a right wrist injury. Podoroska played alongside Mariana Duque Mariño, but lost in the final to Dalila Jakupović and Irina Khromacheva, 3–6, 4–6.

Seeds

Draw

Draw

References 
 Main Draw

Copa Colsanitas - Doubles
2018 Doubles